Arklow Town Football Club are a football club from Arklow, County Wicklow in Ireland. The club's two senior teams are members of the Leinster Senior League and the Wicklow & District Football League.

History
The club was founded in 1948.

In 2009 the club played in the FAI Cup, beating University College Dublin's Leinster Senior League team in the second round, before losing to the UCD first team in the third round.

Notable players
This is a list of notable players who have played with Arklow Town and played either in a professional league or at senior international level;
Aaron Barry
Eric Molloy
Daire O'Connor
Liam Scales

References

External links

Association football clubs in County Wicklow
Leinster Senior League (association football) clubs
1948 establishments in Ireland